the television organisation is a business channel which broadcasts on Sky Digital in the United Kingdom. Their directors and senior executives in the public and private sectors offers business documentaries that discuss how businesses can grow strategically, internationally and provide expert advice to help in the planning, growth and prosperity of their businesses.

As of February 2021, the EPG slot is now taken by Dave va ju.

Overview
The Business Channel.tv provides content for directors and management teams on how to make the right decisions when building or rebuilding their organisations.

Full business documentaries are made available for free-to-view on their website.

Programmes are independent of outside editorial control and do not seek nor accept endorsements for programmes from businesses, organisations, associations or political parties.

Original channel
The Business Channel was originally launched in 2006, broadcasting until late 2008 and run by London International Television. It was branded by Martin Lambie-Nairn, the founder of Lambie-Nairn. The identity was animated by Passion Pictures and Martin Cartoons.

Talent
The Business Channel.tv is run by Graham Littlestone of Greystone Media and Gary Berlyn.

Production company
The programmes are created, filmed, presented and edited in-house.

External links
 Official site

Television channels in the United Kingdom